Nuwakot Palace is a palace built by Nepal's first king Prithvi Narayan Shah in the 18th century and is located in Nuwakot, Bidur Municipality.

The palace is currently being restored after the April 2015 Nepal earthquake which devastated the complex. Nuwakot Palace is currently listed as a UNESCO tentative site since 2008.

References 

Historic sites in Nepal
Shah palaces of Nepal
18th-century establishments in Nepal
Buildings and structures in Nuwakot District